Middelkoop is a Dutch surname. Notable people with the surname include:

Matwé Middelkoop (born 1983), Dutch tennis player

See also
 Middelkoop, town in the Netherlands
 Van Middelkoop

Dutch-language surnames